Bedessa (Geʽez: በዴሳ, Wolaytatto: Badeesa) is a town in Wolayita Zone of the Southern Nations, Nationalities, and Peoples' Region, Ethiopia.  The town is administrative capital of Damot Weyde district of Wolayita Zone, Ethiopia. Bedessa is located about 373 KM away from Addis Ababa to the south on Sodo-Dimtu-Hawassa road, and 21 KM away from Sodo, the capital of Wolaita Zone. The amenities in the town are, 24 hours electricity, pure public water, banks, schools, postal service, telecommunications services and others. The town has a wire bridge which connects the town with other surrounding communities. Bedessa lies between 6°52'58.9"N 37°55'58.5"E.

Demography 
Based on the 2018 population projection by the Central Statistical Agency of Ethiopia, Bedessa has a total population of 35,294, of whom 20,855 are women and 14,439 are men. The majority of the inhabitants were Protestants (86.61%) and 8.0% practiced Ethiopian Orthodox Christianity, 0.0086% were Muslims, and 1.28% were Catholics.

References 

Wolayita
Populated places in the Southern Nations, Nationalities, and Peoples' Region
Cities and towns in Wolayita Zone
Ethiopia
Cities and towns in Ethiopia